Christmas Dream may refer to:

"Christmas Dream", a 1974 song by Andrew Lloyd Webber and Tim Rice
A Christmas Dream, a 1945 Czechoslovak short film by Karel Zeman and Bořivoj Zeman
The Christmas Dream, a 1900 French short film by Georges Méliès

See also
Christmas Dreams, a 1997 album by Don McLean